Michael Paul Chan (born June 26, 1950) is an American actor. He is known for his role as Lieutenant Michael Tao on the TNT series The Closer and Major Crimes. He also acted in U.S. Marshals, playing an assassin.

Biography 

Chan was born in San Francisco, California. A third-generation Chinese American, he is a founding member of the Asian American Theater Company. He is married with one child. His brother was the late Jeffery Paul Chan, an author and academic.

His television work has included roles such as  Judge Lionel Ping on Arrested Development, Detective Ron Lu on Robbery Homicide Division, the voice of Jimmy Ho on The PJ's, Mr. Chong on The Wonder Years, a Japanese investor in the 1990 Northern Exposure episode "Dreams, Schemes and Putting Greens", an agent of the Chinese Intelligence Agency on a 2011 episode of The Simpsons,  and roles on Bones, Babylon 5, Nash Bridges, and The Young and the Restless.

One of his more notable film roles was as the Korean convenience-store owner in the 1993 film Falling Down, where he refused to give a discount to Michael Douglas' character when he attempted to purchase a can of soda to get change for the pay telephone outside the store. Another was as Data's father in The Goonies. He appeared in both of Joel Schumacher's Batman movies, in two different roles - a Wayne Enterprises executive in Batman Forever, and Dr. Lee in Batman & Robin. Other films in his filmography include Americanese, Megiddo: The Omega Code 2, U.S. Marshals, Spy Game, The Protector, Quicksilver, The Joy Luck Club, The Insider, and Thief.

Filmography 

 Thief (1981, Movie)
 The Goonies (1985, Movie)
 Hill Street Blues (1985, TV Series)
 Quicksilver (1986, Movie)
 The Wonder Years (1988–1993, TV Series)
 Thousand Pieces of Gold (1991, Movie)
 The Joy Luck Club (1993, Movie)
 Falling Down (1993, Movie)
 Joshua Tree (1993, Movie)
 Babylon 5 (1994–1998, TV Series)
 JAG (1995, TV series)
 Batman Forever (1995, Movie)
 Nash Bridges (1996–2001, TV Series)
 Batman & Robin (1997, Movie)
 The Protector (1997, Movie)
 U.S. Marshals (1998, Movie)
 The Insider (1999, Movie)
 The Young and the Restless (TV Series)
 Americanese (2006, Movie)
 Megiddo: The Omega Code 2 (2001, Movie)
 Spy Game (2001, Movie)
 Robbery Homicide Division (2002–2003, TV Series)
 Arrested Development (2003–2006, TV Series)
 The Closer (2005–2012, TV Series) – Lt. Tao
 Bones (2005–2017, TV Series)
 Major Crimes (2012–2018, TV Series) – Lt. Tao
 MacGyver (2021, TV Series) – Dollar Tan

References

External links 

1950 births
Living people
Male actors from San Francisco
American male film actors
American male actors of Chinese descent
20th-century American male actors
21st-century American male actors